Lukáš Kovář (born 10 January 1992) is a Czech professional ice hockey defenceman. He played with HC Vítkovice in the Czech Extraliga during the 2010–11 Czech Extraliga season.

References

External links

1992 births
Czech ice hockey defencemen
HC Vítkovice players
Living people
Sportspeople from Ostrava
HK Dukla Trenčín players
Piráti Chomutov players
HC Oceláři Třinec players
HC Frýdek-Místek players
Czech expatriate ice hockey players in Slovakia